CHCO-TV is a Canadian television station, broadcasting in Saint Andrews, New Brunswick and serving the Charlotte County area. CHCO-TV's studios and transmitting antenna are located at the W.C. O'Neill Arena Complex on Reed Avenue in Saint Andrews. The station also has production facilities in the village of Harvey, and in Grand Manan.

The station is available on UHF digital channel 26.1 in Saint Andrews proper, Rogers Cable channel 126 in all of Charlotte County, Bell Fibe TV channel 26 in New Brunswick province wide, and on Bell Satellite channel 539 for New Brunswick and all of Canada.

History
CHCO-TV launched on March 13, 1993 on Fundy Cable channel 4 in Saint Andrews, New Brunswick, Canada as "St. Andrews Community Channel."  The station subsequently applied for a broadcast license in 2005, which was approved by the Canadian Radio-television and Telecommunications Commission (CRTC) on November 23, 2005, and began operation on UHF channel 26 on November 1, 2006 as CHCT-TV.

The advent of fibre optic technology and digital cable shut almost 30 community channels in New Brunswick including those in the neighbouring communities of St. Stephen and St. George. Long time volunteer-operated channels in those communities were replaced in August 2010 by the cable operator's distant community channel in Saint John some 100 kilometres away. St. George and St. Stephen communities receive cable service from a cable headend in Saint Andrews; however Rogers blocked CHCO-TV from being watched outside Saint Andrews for 7 years.

August 18, 2010 CHCT-TV was moved from cable channel 10 to channel 9, launching a new on-air image as "Truly Local Television".

July 28, 2012 CHCT-TV's call sign was changed to CHCO-TV.

December 20, 2012, CHCO-TV was added to the Bell-TV satellite television service on channel 539 to almost 1.6 million subscribers coast to coast.

October 24, 2014, CHCO-TV was added to the Bell Aliant Fibe television service on channel 58 available to most of New Brunswick; and moved to channel 26 on September 8, 2016 to match their licensed over-the-air channel.

November 21, 2018, CHCO-TV was finally made available to mainland cable subscribers county-wide on channel 126 after CHCO-TV volunteers presented before the CRTC just one month earlier during a Rogers' license renewal with the commission.

Today
CHCO-TV is the first community LPTV station in New Brunswick to operate independently from the cable television provider. It is also the only locally owned and operated television station in the Province of New Brunswick. CHCO-TV broadcasts local events, town council meetings, local sports, and produces such programs as NewsBreak26 with Vicki Hogarth, Fundy Tidings, NBWA: New Brunswickers Want Action, The Carr Brothers LIVE, Mc & T's Sports Report, The Rob Patry Show, John Higgins LIVE, What's the Call, The Etiquette Guy, Southwest Magazine, Your Town Matters, CHCO-TV Bingo and commentaries with Ross Ingram.

Transition to Digital Television
On February 15, 2021 CHCO-TV started broadcasting their signal in high definition digital TV and concluded broadcasting their traditional analog/NTSC broadcast on UHF channel 26. On July 23, 2021 Rogers cable began distribution of CHCO-DT in HD.

External links
 
 

Hco
Hco
Canadian community channels
Television channels and stations established in 1993
1993 establishments in New Brunswick
Saint Andrews, New Brunswick